Füruzan  (born Füruzan Yerdelen, October 29, 1932) is a self-taught Turkish writer, who is highly regarded for her sensitive characterisations of the poor and her depictions of Turkish immigrants abroad.

Biography 
Born in Istanbul, Turkey, she enjoyed reading as a child but left school in the eighth grade following the death of her father. She worked as an actress with the Little Theater acting company and began writing poems and short stories. She married cartoonist Turhan Selçuk in 1958 and the couple had one child before they divorced. She became a full-time writer following her divorce in 1968. She published her first collection of short stories Parasiz Yatili (Free Boarding School) in 1971 and was awarded the Sait Faik Short Story Award. She published her first novel 47’liler (Those Born in ’47) in 1975 won and was awarded the Turkish Language Association Novel Award.

English language bibliography 
One collection of Füruzan's short stories has been published in English translation.

A Summer Full of Love 
A 2001 short story collection by Turkish writer Füruzan published by Milet Books, in dual Turkish and English translation by Damian Croft, as part of its series of Turkish-English Short Story Collections.

The publisher states that the author, “displays her remarkable sensitivity, psychological insight and evocative sense of place, while looking at the pleasures and pressures of family relations and the impact of social class divisions.”

A review in Write Away states that the style of the work, “is an excellent introduction to the techniques of short story writing, and encourages a realization of the different parameters that this genre requires,” before concluding that this is, “A challenging and immensely rewarding read...”

Editions

On-line translations 
The River at Boğaziçi University.
In the Park by the Pier at Boğaziçi University.

Bibliography

Short story collections 
Parasiz Yatili (Free Boarding School) (1971)
Kusatma (The Siege) (1972),
Benim Sinemalarim (My Cinemas) (1973),
Gecenin Oteki Yuzu (The Other Face of the Night) (1982),
Gul Mevsimidir (It’s the Season for Roses) (1985).
"Su Ustası Miraç"

Novels 
47’liler (Those Born in ’47) (1975),
Berlin’in Nar Cicegi (The Pomegranate Blossom of Berlin) (1988).

Filmography 
Sira sende fistik (1971, as actress)
Ah güzel Istanbul (1981, as writer)
Benim sinemalarim (My Cinemas) (1990, as writer & director)

Awards 
Awarded the 1971 Sait Faik Short Story Award for Parasiz Yatili (Free Boarding School)
Awarded the 1975 Turkish Language Association Novel Award for 47’liler (Those Born in ’47 )

References 

Turkish novelists
1931 births
Living people
Turkish women writers